Over the Sun is a 2004 album by Shannon Wright.

Track listing
Intro/With Closed Eyes – 4:39
Portray – 5:36
Black Little Stray – 6:20
You'll Be the Death – 4:07
Throw a Blanket Over the Sun – 4:25
Avalanche – 4:49
If Only We Could – 4:07
Plea – 4:08
Birds – 4:07

Japanese bonus track
 Insolvable Self – 4:11

2004 albums
Shannon Wright albums